The 1967 Federation Cup was the fifth edition of what is now known as the Fed Cup. 17 nations participated in the tournament, which was held at the Blau-Weiss Tennis Club in West Berlin from 6–11 June. United States defended their title, defeating Great Britain in the final.

Participating teams

Draw
All ties were played at the Blau-Weiss Tennis Club in West Berlin on clay courts.

First round
Italy vs. Belgium

Second round
Great Britain vs. Sweden

Netherlands vs. Italy

Switzerland vs. Canada

Denmark vs. West Germany

Norway vs. South Africa

Rhodesia vs. United States

Quarterfinals
Australia vs. France

Great Britain vs. Italy

Canada vs. West Germany

South Africa vs. United States

Semifinals
Australia vs. Great Britain

West Germany vs. United States

Final
Great Britain vs. United States

References

Billie Jean King Cups by year
Federation Cup
Federation Cup
Federation Cup
Federation Cup
Federation Cup
Federation Cup
June 1967 sports events in Europe
1967 in German tennis